Giles or Gyles is a masculine given name.
 
Giles is the Medieval English form of the name of the French hermit Saint Giles, 
which itself is the Old French form of the Latin name Aegidius. The modern French forms are Gilles and the less common Égide.

Notable people with this given name
Giles
 Saint Giles, 7th/8th-century Christian hermit saint
 Giles of Assisi, Aegidius of Assisi, 13th-century companion of St. Francis of Assisi
 Giles of Rome, 13th-century archbishop
 Giles Beecher Jackson (1853–1924), African-American lawyer, newspaper publisher, entrepreneur, and civil rights activist
 Giles Blunt (born 1952), Canadian novelist and screenwriter
 Giles Chichester (born 1946), British Conservative Party politician
 Giles Coren (born 1969), British journalist
 Giles Corey (1621–1692), victim of the Salem witch trials
 Giles Fraser (born 1964), English Anglican priest and broadcaster
 Giles Gilbert Scott (1880–1960), British architect
 Giles Henderson (born 1942), CBE, Master of Pembroke College, Oxford
 Giles Ji Ungpakorn (born 1953), Thai academic and Marxist political activist
 Giles Kristian (born 1975), British author
 Giles Martin (born 1969), English record producer and songwriter
 Giles Pellerin (1906–1998), American businessman most famous for attending every game of the USC Trojans football team from 1925 until his death
 Giles Radice, Baron Radice (born 1936), British politician
 Giles Scott-Smith, political researcher
 Giles Terera, actor and singer (Hamilton UK)

Gilles
 Gilles Peterson (born 1964), British musician and disc jockey

Gyles
 Gyles Brandreth (born 1948), English writer
 Gyles Isham (1903–1976), English actor
 Gyles Longley (1918–2015), British officer
 Gyles Mackrell (1889–1959), British tea planter
 Henry Gyles Turner (1831–1920), Australian banker

Fictional characters
Giles Wemmbley-Hogg of British radio comedy Giles Wemmbley-Hogg Goes Off
Farmer Giles of Ham (Latin Ægidius Ahenobarbus Julius Agricola de Hammo) is the title character of the comic fable by J. R. R. Tolkien
Giles Habibula, a character in the Legion of Space Series by Jack Williamson

See also
Gyles v Wilcox
Giles (disambiguation)
Giles (surname)
Gilles (given name)
Saint Giles (disambiguation)
Tilen, Slovenian version of the name
Egidio
All pages beginning with Giles

References

Masculine given names
English masculine given names